Keith Sanderson (9 October 1940 – 24 December 2022) was an English footballer who played as a midfielder for Queens Park Rangers in the 1960s.

Career
Sanderson made his debut for Queens Park Rangers in the 6–1 defeat by local rivals, Brentford, on the opening day of the 1965–66 season after signing from Plymouth Argyle. Things got better and Sanderson was part of the successful 1966–67 team managed by Alec Stock that won both the Third Division Championship and the Football League Cup Final 1967 at Wembley beating WBA 3–2.

Sanderson was a tireless midfielder, doing the running for more glamorous colleagues like Rodney Marsh and went on to play 104 league games, scoring 10 goals. Sanderson was also remarkable in that he was a part-time player (he worked in computers in his "day job").

Death
Sanderson died in a traffic collision on 24 December 2022, at the age of 82.

References

External links

1940 births
2022 deaths
English footballers
Footballers from Kingston upon Hull
Association football midfielders
Queens Park Rangers F.C. players
Wimbledon F.C. players
Bath City F.C. players
Harwich & Parkeston F.C. players
English Football League players
Goole Town F.C. players
Plymouth Argyle F.C. players